UDP-GlcNAc:betaGal beta-1,3-N-acetylglucosaminyltransferase 2 is an enzyme that in humans is encoded by the B3GNT2 gene.

This gene encodes a member of the beta-1,3-N-acetylglucosaminyltransferase family. This enzyme is a type II transmembrane protein. It prefers the substrate of lacto-N-neotetraose, and is involved in the biosynthesis of poly-N-acetyllactosamine chains.

References

External links

Further reading